The Ministry of Employment, Social and Family Affairs of the Republic of Somaliland (MoESFA)  is a ministry of the Somaliland cabinet which is concerned by for setting national labour standards, employment, workforce participation, family affairs and social services.
The current minister is Hinda Jama Hersi.

See also
 Politics of Somaliland
 Cabinet of Somaliland

References

External links
Official Site of the Ministry

Politics of Somaliland
Government ministries of Somaliland